The following is a list of experimental cat breeds and crossbreeds that do not have the recognition of any major national or international cat registries, such as The International Cat Association (TICA) in the US, Europe, and Australasia; the Governing Council of the Cat Fancy (GCCF) in the UK, the Fédération Internationale Féline (FiFE) in continental Europe, the Cat Fanciers' Association (CFA) in North America, or the more recent World Cat Federation based in Germany. Such a breed may be recognized by one of the smaller cat registries. Smaller registries include the Rare and Exotic Feline Registry (REFR), the Dwarf Cat Association (TDCA), and others.  

Breeders of some minority breeds actively seek major recognition for them, but have yet to receive it. For example, in regions where the formal cat fancy is in its infancy, naturally occurring native varieties – landraces – can be classified as minority breeds when attempts at selective breeding have begun to produce a formal natural breed with consistent traits, as is ongoing with the Aegean and Van cats. Other minority breeds are bred for private reasons and inadvertently attract an informal following. Minority breeds may be recognized by some registries, or none at all; recognition can be refused for a variety of reasons (including over-similarity to an existing breed, medical problems being statistically linked to the breed, and others). Some may have "preliminary" status in one or more registries, with experimental conformation standards already in place, but turn out to be non-viable over the longer term.

Discrepancies between breed names can often cause confusion; occasionally the name adopted by one registry is used elsewhere for an entirely different breed; for example, the breed known in Australia as "Burmilla Longhair" is analogous to the "Asian Semi-longhair" in Britain (also called the "Tiffanie"), but Australia already has a quite different breed known as the "Australian Tiffanie" and both are different from the American "Tiffany" (also known as the Chantilly-Tiffany).  Such conflicts are decreasing due to better communication between registries, largely facilitated by the Internet and by the World Cat Congress.

Aegean

The Aegean is a  cat of Greek origin that has been developed since the 1990s by the Feline Federation of Greece, using cats from the Cyclades. The name 'Aegean' comes from the fact that the cats were originally found around the Aegean Sea. They are considered a national treasure of Greece. Aegean cats are a landrace, and are one of the oldest distinct populations of the domestic cat. They have an affinity for fishing and water, and are numerous in Greek fishing ports. It is a medium-sized, muscular cat with a lighter European or Continental type body, medium-sized round paws, and green almond-shaped eyes. The coat is always two or three colors, one of which is always white.  The breed is mostly free from common feline diseases.

Alpine Lynx

The Alpine Lynx is a white, short-tailed cat breed that can have either curled or straight ears. They may be either short- or long-haired, and may have tufted toes. They are a medium-sized breed whose back legs are longer than their front legs. It was developed from a cross between a Highlander and a white barn cat. It is recognized by the Rare and Exotic Feline Registry.

American Lynx Cat
The American Lynx is a short-haired cat breed with a spotted coat. This breed is bob-tailed or short-tailed.  The coat pattern bears some resemblance to the bobcat. This breed is recognized by the Rare and Exotic Feline Registry.

American Polydactyl
The American Polydactyl is a polydactyl cat, meaning that it has more than the usual number of toes. This breed is currently in development.  it is recognized (since 2004) only by the Rare and Exotic Feline Registry.

Australian Tiffanie
The Australian Tiffanie is a cat breed derived from crosses between the short-haired Burmilla and the long-haired Chinchilla Persian. These cats resemble the old style of the Chinchilla Longhair. Some name confusion exists with this breed; this Australian cat is not the same as the Tiffanie breed in Europe (also known as the Burmilla Longhair) or the Tiffany breed in the United States. It is recognized by the Waratah State Cat Alliance.

Bramble
The Bramble is a large wire-haired cat breed with a spotted coat pattern. It was derived from crossing the Bengal with brush-coated Peterbalds. It originates from the US and is recognized by the Rare and Exotic Feline Registry.

Burmilla Longhair (Tiffanie) 
The Burmilla Longhair breed is of UK origin and is a variant of the (normally) short-haired Burmilla, which is itself a cross between the Burmese and Chinchilla Persian. In the Burmilla Longhair, the recessive gene inherited from the Chinchilla is prominent. These cats are known in the U.K. as the Tiffanie, but are different from the Australian Tiffanie.

Classicat (Jungala)
The Classicat is a cat breed originating from New Zealand. It is overall an Ocicat-type, but has a coat with the classic swirled tabby pattern. It is recognized by the New Zealand Cat Fancy.

Desert Lynx

The Desert Lynx is a bob-tailed or short-tailed cat breed of US origin. This cat has spotted or marbled markings and resembles the bobcat, and the breed is recognized by the Rare and Exotic Feline Registry.

Dwelf
The Dwelf cat is a hairless, short-legged, curly-eared cat breed derived from Sphynx, American Curl, and Munchkin stock. The breed is of US origin and is recognized by the Dwarf Cat Association (or Designer Cat Association).

Elf
The Elf or Elf Sphynx is a nearly hairless variety with ears that curl backward.  The gene responsible for hairlessness in the Sphynx (and thus in the Elf) produces skin that is not completely hairless; two types of hair formation occur: a few patches of light hairs particularly around the nose, tail, and toes; and a fine downy all-over covering.  Care issues are as with Sphynx cats.  this in-development variety is not recognized by major breed registries and cat-fancier organizations such as The International Cat Association (TICA) or the Cat Fanciers' Association (CFA). Some breeders have published draft breed standards for the Elf, based on those for the foundation breeds, but these documents are not entirely consistent with each other. Breeders are seeking TICA recognition as a preliminary new breed. The Elf has been included in the Australian National Cats (ANCats) breed list as experimental.

Foldex

The Foldex cat, also known as the Exotic Fold, is a cat breed developed in the Canadian province of Quebec by crossbreeding a Scottish Fold and an Exotic Shorthair. The physical features of the Foldex include its medium size, rounded face, short legs, and folded ears, the latter being the defining feature of the Foldex. The eyes are well-rounded and wide open, and the ears are equipped with small and smooth-edged tips. The coat can vary from long to short hair, and is naturally dense and soft.

Genetta
The Genetta is a cat breed derived from crossbreeding the Bengal and Munchkin breeds to create a spotted, long-bodied, short-legged cat that resembles the African genet (which is not a felid). This breed is of US origin.

Highlander (Highland Lynx)

Originally developed in 1993 as the REFR-registered Highland Lynx, this cat is a crossbreed of the Desert Lynx and the Jungle Curl, to add the latter's curled ears to the former. It became known as the Highlander in 2005, and was recognized by TICA in 2008. Though the breed is said to resemble the bobcat and was originally given a name that included the word "lynx", it is a wholly domestic cat without any bobcat (or any other lynx species) ancestry.

Jungle
The Jungle cat (not to be confused with the wild species called the jungle cat (Felis chaus)) is a long-tailed, spotted or marbled cat breed. It is derived from crossing the Bengal and Chausie breeds, both of which are felid hybrids. This breed applied for experimental status with the International Cat Association (TICA) in Europe in 2010.

Jungle Curl
The Jungle Curl cat is a felid hybrid cat breed of US origin, primarily a cross between the Jungle cat (see above) and the American Curl, with the addition of several other spotted cat breeds, including the Egyptian Mau, the Serengeti and the Bengal.

Kucing Malaysia (Piawaian Kucing Malaysia)
The Kucing Malaysia, or Piawaian Kucing Malaysia, is the first indigenous Malaysian cat breed. It has a conformation similar to the Tonkinese, while its color is similar to the Ragdoll. These cats have a white blaze on the face and muzzle and white markings on the colorpoint limbs. It is recognized by the Malaysian Cat Club.

Lambkin (Nanus Rex)
The Lambkin, also known as the Nanus Rex, is a short-legged cat breed of US origin with a densely curled coat. They are derived from crossing the Munchkin and the Selkirk Rex. This breed is recognized by the Dwarf Cat Association (TDCA).

Mandalay
The Mandalay is a cat breed originally derived from crosses between domestic short-haired cats and the Burmese. Later, Abyssinians were used to introduce the cinnamon and fawn genes.  These cats resemble the Asian Shorthair that is bred in Europe. There should be no evidence of sepia-pointing; i.e., contrast between points and body. This breed originated in New Zealand and is recognized by the New Zealand Cat Fancy.

Minuet (Napoleon)

The Minuet, also known as the Napoleon, is a cat breed of US origin that crosses the Munchkin with either Persian or Exotic Shorthair bloodlines. This results in a cat with a Persian's appearance, but with short legs. This breed is of US origin and has been recognized by the Dwarf Cat Association, with recognition being sought by the International Cat Association.

Mojave Spotted
The Mojave Spotted is a polydactyl cat with a spotted coat. They are derived from crosses between Bengal bloodlines and those of the naturally occurring polydactyl cats from the Mojave Desert region in the US. This breed is recognized by the Rare and Exotic Feline Registry.

Owyhee Bob

The Owyhee Bob is a cat breed that is a mix of the Siamese and Manx cats, and is of United States origin. The most distinctive feature of this cat is its color and build, and it is slow to mature like the Manx. The Owyhee Bob is a colorpoint breed (like the Siamese), of medium to large size. The body is medium in length, hard and muscular with a broad chest. The head shape is medium to large with full cheekbones and whisker pads, giving a rounded appearance to the muzzle. The strong chin gives a balanced appearance to the head. The ears are medium to large, wide set, full at the base and tapering, standing straight and upright, sometimes feathering to a rounded tip that is often tufted in the longer-haired cats. The large oval eyes are slightly slanted and wide set, and are always Siamese blue. Legs are medium in length and are sturdy and well-muscled. Paws are large and round (and can be polydactyl).
Females range from 8 to 12 pounds and males from 12 to 16 pounds, with some getting larger.

The tails come in rumpy, stumpy and longy, with some breeders docking the long tails (in countries where this is still legal). They come in all coat lengths except hairless. The coat is soft and plush, like that of a rabbit, and should not be curly or wavy. The Owyhee Bob is sometimes said to have a temperament that is more like that of a dog than a cat; they can be taught to sit, lie down, and play fetch. They are a vocal breed. They are currently recognized only by the Rare and Exotic Feline Registry.

Pantherette

The Pantherette is a felid hybrid cat breed that is intended to resemble a black panther. It is derived from either the wild Amur or Indian leopard cat subspecies (Prionailurus bengalensis euptilura or Prionailurus bengalensis bengalensis, respectively) or the melanistic (black) Bengal crossed to either the Maine Coon or the black full-tailed Pixie-Bob. This breed is large, muscular, and short-haired with resemblances to a melanistic leopard and is of US origin. The Pantherette is a separate breed from the black variety of Bengal and is still in development.

Pudelkatze (Poodlecat)

The Pudelkatze or Poodlecat is a cat breed developed in Germany in the 1980s by Rosemarie Wolf. It is derived from crosses of the Devon Rex, the Scottish Fold, and the European Longhair (also known as the Britannica in Europe or the Lowlander in the US). The option exists to introduce the Manx bloodline as well. This breed cannot be recognized in its native Germany, due to legislation that bans the folded-ear traits.  It is a large cat that resembles a chunky Devon Rex with a thick, dense lamb-like coat and folded ears.

Punjabi (Punjabi Desert Cat)

The Punjabi, or Punjabi Desert Cat, is a short-haired cat breed derived from crossing the felid hybrid Bengal cat with the undomesticated Indian desert cat, which is a variety of the Asiatic wildcat (Felis lybica ornata). This breed replicates the look of the Indian desert cat, yet retains the domestic temperament of the Bengal. In regards to appearance, the coat has small random spots on an ivory or pale sandy background. This breed was first developed in Belgium.

Russian Shorthair

The Russian Shorthair is a breed name used to cover all varieties of the Russian type, including the Russian Blue, Russian Peach, Russian White, Russian Black and Russian
Colorpoint. Tabbies and bicolors also occur.  These cats occur naturally in Russia, but in the 19th century, only the Russian Blue was perpetuated by the British and American cat fancies. The White and Black colors were recreated through crossing Russian Blues with domestic cats of similar conformation. Russian Colorpoints also occurred in Great Britain, due to crossing Russian Blues with blue point Siamese cats.  Some of the individual colors are recognized under their own names. As a whole, these cats may originate from Russia, Australia or Europe (Russian Black, Russian White, Russian Tabby), the US (Russian Peach), or Britain (Russian Colorpoint).

Safari

The Safari is a large, spotted or rosetted cat breed. It is a felid hybrid developed by crossing Geoffroy's cat (Leopardus geoffroyi), a wild South American species, with domestic cats.  Although bred before the Bengal, this breed has been eclipsed by the latter's success.  It occurs in a variety of colors, and the coat combines the spotting of the Geoffroy's with the colors of the domestic breeds. This breed is of US origin.

Seltic

The Seltic is a variant of the Selkirk Rex cat breed. It resembles the Selkirk Rex in all ways, except the Seltic is without the Rex mutation and has a straight-haired coat. This breed is of US origin and is recognized by the United Feline Organization (UFO).

Skookum
The Skookum is a Munchkin-type cat breed with curly fur. It is derived from crossing the Munchkin with the LaPerm, a Rex breed. This breed originates in the US and was previously known as the LaMerm. It is recognized by the Dwarf Cat Association (TDCA).

St. Helens
The St. Helens is an emerging cat breed from Cyprus under the auspices of the Cyprus Feline Society (CyFS).

Stone Cougar
The Stone Cougar is a jungle cat (Felis chaus)/domestic cat felid hybrid developed to resemble the American cougar. In addition to the cougar-like color, the body is thick and low to the ground, the tail is thick and the ears are small. This breed is of US origin and is recognized by the Rare and Exotic Feline Registry.

Tasman Manx
The Tasman Manx is a curly-furred Manx-type cat breed that arose spontaneously in some Australian and New Zealand Manx crossbreeding lines.  All can trace their ancestry to a single Persian stud that had European ancestry. This same cat may also be responsible for the Bohemian Rex (or Czech Curly Cat). Apart from the curly fur, these cats have the characteristics and conformation of the Manx.
This cat is now recognised by NZCF.

Van cat

The Van cat is a landrace, native to the Lake Van area of Turkey (and not to be confused with the standardized Turkish Van breed, or the Turkish Angora breed).  A state-sponsored breeding program is under way to true-breed some specimens into a standardized cat breed with fixed traits.

See also
Cat body-type mutation
List of cat breeds
 Cat registry
 Cat genetics
 Designer crossbred
 Felid hybrid
 Lists of domestic animal breeds

References

External links
 The Canadian Cat Association - Association Féline Canadienne (CCA/AFC)
 The Dwarf Cat Association (TDCA)
  The Fédération Internationale Féline (FiFE)
 The International Cat Association (TICA)
 The Rare and Exotic Feline Registry (REFR)
 The World Cat Federation (WCF)

 
Cat
Lists of cats